Nappa is a hamlet in the Craven district of North Yorkshire, England. The population was estimated at 10 in 2010.

The place name Nappa, first mentioned in the Domesday Book as Napars, is of uncertain origin, but possibly derives from the Old English hnæpp ġehæġ, meaning "enclosure in a bowl-shaped hollow".

Nappa was historically a township in the ancient parish of Gisburn in the West Riding of Yorkshire.  It became a separate civil parish in 1866.  It was transferred to the new county of North Yorkshire in 1974.  The civil parish was abolished in 2014 and amalgamated with the parish of Hellifield.

References

External links

Villages in North Yorkshire
Former civil parishes in North Yorkshire